TMA-5 may be:

 2,3,6-Trimethoxyamphetamine, a hallucinogenic drug
 Soyuz TMA-5, a Russian space exploration mission